Profane Genocidal Creations is the second full album by German melodic black metal band Dark Fortress. It was released in February 2003.

Track listing
 "Introduction" - 1:45
 "Defiance of Death" - 8:36
 "Passage to Extinction" - 9:11
 "In Morte Aeternitas" - 9:04
 "Moribound Be Thy Creation" - 6:19
 "Through Ages of War" - 6:05
 "Blood of the Templars" - 7:20
 "Warlord (Face the Angel of Pestilence)" - 5:02
 "Battles Rage in the Infernal Depth" - 6:49
 "A Fortress Dark" - 8:16

Total playing time 68:27

Personnel

Additional personnel
 Christophe Szpajdel – logo

External links
 Encyclopaedia Metallum

References

2003 albums
Dark Fortress albums